Convergence (1997) is a science fiction novel in the Heritage Universe series by American writer Charles Sheffield. This book is a sequel to Transcendence.

Plot
The book takes place millennia in the future with the same group of explorers introduced in the first two books of the series, Summertide and Divergence. After millions of years of apparent inaction, the Builder artifacts are changing quickly. After exploring several new artifacts, rediscovering the existence of a race thought to be dead for millennia, and finding that race's home planet in the midst of an enormous artifact, the adventures of this eclectic team become even stranger.

In this book the characters explore several old artifacts to find that they have changed. These changes all seemed to be linked to a seemingly new artifact, which may affect the future of the entire Orion Arm of the galaxy.

The sequel to this book and series finale is Resurgence.

1997 American novels
Novels by Charles Sheffield
1997 science fiction novels
Baen Books books